V. juncea may refer to:

 Viminaria juncea, a pea endemic to Australia
 Virgularia juncea, a sea pen